This is a list of annual cultural festivals held in colleges in India. This list is divided into several sections that divide colleges on the basis of the regions or states of India. The only exceptions to this format are Indian Institutes of Management (IIMs), Indian Institutes of Technology (IITs), and National Institutes of Technology (NITs) which are listed separately under their own sections. The largest cultural festival in terms of numbers is: Flare of Pandit Deendayal Energy University (Social and Cultural Committee), Antaragni of IIT Kanpur, and largest technical festival in terms of numbers is Techkriti of IIT Kanpur.

Indian Institutes of Management and other business schools

Indian Institutes of Technology, National Institutes of Technology, and Indian Institute of Information Technology

West India

Goa

Gujarat

Maharashtra

Central India

East India

West Bengal

North India

Delhi NCR

Northeast India

South India

Tamil Nadu

Karnataka 

| Puducherry || Pondicherry || Aarupadai Veedu Medical College Hospital || Reflex
|}

Kerala

Telangana

Tamil Nadu

References

|}

College
India, college
Cultural festivals in Indian colleges
Cultural festivals in Indian colleges